Boning, Böning or Boening may refer to

Actions and objects
 Boning (also deboning), removing the bones from a carcass in butchering
 Boning (baseball), rubbing a bat with bone
 Boning, vulgar slang for sexual intercourse
 Boning (corsetry), the rigid parts of a corset

People
 John Boning (1805–1879), English cricketer
 Wigald Boning (born 1967), German entertainer

Places
 Boning Island in the Andaman Islands

People named Böning or Boening
 Alfred Böning (1907–1984), German engineer
 Walter Böning (1894–1981), German fighter pilot
 Shane Van Boening (born 1983), American pool player
 Marie Boening Kendall (1885–1953), American painter

See also 
 Bonin (disambiguation)